Tapas Dey is a former Member of the Legislative Assembly and ex-Vice President of Tripura Pradesh Congress Committee.

References

Indian male journalists
Indian National Congress politicians
Living people
Tripura MLAs 1972–1977
Year of birth missing (living people)
People from Agartala
Tripura politicians
Journalists from Tripura